Vladimir Ivanovich Kishkun (born 5 November 1951 in Leningrad) is a Russian former athlete who competed in the 1976 Summer Olympics.

References

1951 births
Living people
Russian male pole vaulters
Olympic athletes of the Soviet Union
Athletes (track and field) at the 1976 Summer Olympics
European Athletics Championships medalists
Soviet male pole vaulters
Athletes from Saint Petersburg